The site of the old Newbie Castle, Newbay Castle or Newby Castle was the caput of the Barony of Newbie near Annan close to the River Annan's confluence with the Solway Firth in Dumfries and Galloway, Scotland. Held by the Corries and then the Johnstones. Newbie Harbour on the River Annan was located nearby.

History
Newbie Castle was demolished circa 1816 when Newbie Mains Farm was constructed, using the stones from the castle. A small section of walling is all that remains. In the 13th century, the Battle of Bruce's Acres took place near Muirbeck Wood as shown on the 1926 Edition of the OS map. Robert the Bruce is said to have "sustained a severe repulse from the English" here. Human bones and several swords were uncovered in Newbie Moss close to the field where this action is said to have been fought.

Description of the castle and lands

Newbie is considered to have been a tower castle, surrounded by a moat with drawbridge. A tree in a nearby plantation is marked as the Marquesses Tree on early Ordnance Survey maps. Newbie Castle had been damaged in various sieges and the laird appropriated his relative Robert Johnstone’s legacies to use stone intended for a bridge over the River Annan to build a modern extension to the existing old square tower.

In 1857, the OS map shows the 'Marquis' Tree' in a small plantation to the north-east of the old castle. In 1924, the site of the tree is still indicated. The significance of this pear tree in garden of the old Castle Garden is that it is said to have been planted by one of the Marquises of Annandale.

In 1859, two sets of stone coffins or kistvaens with human remains were found close to the shoreline just to the west of Newbie Mains Farm towards Newbie Cottages.

The Newbie Burn runs down from Newbie Muir and enters the sea at Newbie Mains.

Newbie Mill
The old Newbie Barony mill was powered by the Old Mill Burn with the headwaters at Newbie Loch, now drained. In the 1848-1858 OS Name Book Newbie Mill describes the mill present at that date as "A large mill three storeys high with dwelling house and offices attached all in good repair. It is wrought by water; and is used for grinding wheat and corn and is ocupied by Thomas Martin: and is the property of Edward McKenzie Esqr. Folly Court London. This Mill contains 5 pairs of stones and 1 for barley - it is 18 horsepower - having also a thrashing Machine".

Cartographic evidence

Blaeu's map of 1654, based on Timothy Pont's earlier map, shows a tower with associated buildings and extensive formal gardens with plantations or orchards. A small building is shown nearby overlooking the shore and a small island is present just off the coast. A circular wooded area surrounded by a pale or fence lies just to the north. The name is written as 'New bay Castle' and Newbay Loch is shown nearby with an outflow running into the River Annan.

Herman Moll's 1732 map shows the situation unchanged from Blaeu's map.

Roys mid-18th century map shows the castle; however, the circular wooded area and island are nor recorded. The 1732 map by 

The 1804 Crawford map shows 'Newby Old Tower' without any garden or woodland features.

John Ainslie's 1821 map records a 'Tower', but again without any garden or other estate features.  In 1828 the situation remained unchanged.

By 1857 the name 'Newbie' is used on maps and the location of the old castle is indicated.

The Lairds of Newbie
Thomas Corrie of Kelwood and Newbie died in 1513, possibly at the Battle of Flodden. After being sold to the Johnstones they acquired possession after a series of disputes. Kelwood was held by the Corrie's until at least 1627. It was held latterly by the Marquises of Annandale.

Sir James Johnstone had purchased the Barony of Newbie as stated however it took twenty-four years of legal action before the last of the relatives of the Corries. Sir James died with significant debts as a result of the litigation, etc. Robert Johnstone of Raecleuch moved into Newbie Castle as the guardian of the new young laird. The creditors attempted to have the Johnstones removed, including Edward Johnstone of Ryehill, the laird's brothers David and Abraham, Adam and John Johnstone of Mylnfield, his grandson John, several nephews, etc. By 1609 Edward Johnstone had use of part of the property however he had died by 1611. In 1639 the Corries of Kelwood and Newbie were still taking legal action against John's widow Bessie and their son George. The history of the lairds is a complex series of costly legal disputes amongst the wider family. 

As stated, the barony of Newbie was held latterly by the Marquises of Annandale who were members of the Johnstone clan.

Historical incidents

Sir John Dalziel of Glennie and others travelled "to the Lord Annandale’s house at Newbie to pay him a visit, beginning with their old pranks, burning their shirts and other linens. A little after that the house was all burnt, and it was reported of my lord himself he knew the house would never do good, for it was builded with the thing that should have builded the bridge over Annan water. It is said that the servants in the house were amusing themselves with drinking burnt brandy while Lord Annandale was away, and his coach driving suddenly to the door, they thrust the blazing spirits under a bed which caused the conflagration. The blaze was so great that the chambermaids in Sir John Douglas’s house at Kelhead, three miles distant, could prepare the bedrooms without candles."

In 1618 Annan Town Council had "for the safe transport of his Majesty’s subjects, and in respect of the great poverty of the said burgh, had kept a boat and exacted dues, and now John Johnstone, burgess of Annan, also called John of Mylnfield, and others, would not let it pass their land".

Newby Harbour
Crawford's 1804 records Newby Harbour lying nearby as an inlet off the River Annan. In 1821, Ainslie's map records Newby Harbour, although an inlet is not shown. The harbour is shown as an inlet in 1828. The Old Mill Burn has its confluence with the River Annan at the harbour. The harbour site has silted up due to the building of stone piers on the river that direct the water flow and maintain a deep water channel for shipping using Annan Harbour. It now forms part of Milnfield Merse. No details survive as to the function of the harbour; however, before the bridge was built, an easy crossing of the River Annan would require a boat of some description.

References
Notes

Sources

Coventry, Martin (2010). Castles of the Clans. Musselburgh : Goblinshead.

External links
 Video footage of Annan Harbour
 Video footage of the Gala Glen and Bruce's Well

Annan, Dumfries and Galloway
Annandale and Eskdale
Ports and harbours of Scotland
Royal burghs
Dumfriesshire
Parishes in Dumfries and Galloway
Castles in Dumfries and Galloway
Tower houses in Scotland